The Pine Ridge School Building is a historic school building in rural Izard County, Arkansas. It was built c. 1920, fashioned out of uncoursed native sandstone with grapevine mortar joints. A central gable-roofed entrance portico extends from the center of the building's north facade. It is a fine local example of an early 20th-century one-room school building.

The building was listed on the National Register of Historic Places in 1994, at which time it was being used as a church by a local Seventh-day Adventist congregation.

See also
National Register of Historic Places listings in Izard County, Arkansas

References

School buildings on the National Register of Historic Places in Arkansas
Churches in Izard County, Arkansas
National Register of Historic Places in Izard County, Arkansas
1920 establishments in Arkansas
Education in Izard County, Arkansas
School buildings completed in 1920